María Josefina Sruoga (born 23 August 1990) is an Argentine field hockey player. At the 2012 Summer Olympics, she competed for the Argentina national team where the team won the silver medal. Josefina also won four Champions Trophies, the bronze medal at the 2014 World Cup and two silver medals at the Pan American Games.  Her sister Dani was also part of the Argentine team that won silver at the 2012 Summer Olympics.

References

External links 
 

1990 births
Living people
Field hockey players from Buenos Aires
Argentine female field hockey players
Olympic field hockey players of Argentina
Field hockey players at the 2012 Summer Olympics
Olympic medalists in field hockey
Las Leonas players
Olympic silver medalists for Argentina
Medalists at the 2012 Summer Olympics
Pan American Games silver medalists for Argentina
Argentine people of Lithuanian descent
Field hockey players at the 2011 Pan American Games
Field hockey players at the 2015 Pan American Games
Pan American Games medalists in field hockey
Medalists at the 2011 Pan American Games
Medalists at the 2015 Pan American Games